2017 Facebook live streaming incident may refer to:

 2017 Uppsala rape
 2017 Chicago torture incident

See also
 Livestreamed crime
 Shooting of Robert Godwin, a 2017 case in which a video of the crime was posted online (but not live streamed) by the perpetrator